Michael T. Sangma was an Indian politician. He was elected as a member of Meghalaya Legislative Assembly from Tikrikilla in 2013. He died of heart attack on 13 August 2019 at the age of 41.

References

1970s births
2019 deaths
Independent politicians in India
Meghalaya MLAs 2013–2018
People from West Garo Hills district
Garo people